Jody Simon (born June 4, 1956) is an American pharmacist and retired professional wrestler, better known by his ring name, Joe Malenko. He is the son of Boris Malenko and the older brother of Dean Malenko.

Professional wrestling career

Japan
Malenko is most known for his stints wrestling in Japan. Malenko began in the Universal Wrestling Federation (Japan) in May 1985 for 13 days. One of his most well known matches in the UWF was his tag match with Super Tiger where they faced the team of Yoshiaki Fujiwara and Osamu Kido.

Malenko would then team up with his brother, Dean, in All Japan Pro Wrestling to form "The Malenko Brothers". Malenko would tour regularly with All Japan from February 1988 until May 1992. Malenko had two reigns as World Junior Heavyweight Champion. From late 1989 to early 1990, he teamed with Kenta Kobashi against the Can-Am Express (Dan Kroffat and Doug Furnas) for the All Asia Tag Team Championship. Joe's most memorable matches came in his match versus his brother, Dean and when they (the Malenko Brothers) faced The British Bruisers (Johnny Smith and Dynamite Kid) during Giant Baba's 30th Wrestling Anniversary on September 30, 1990. Joe and Dean's only chance for the All Asia Tag Team Championship was against the Can-Am Express on March 4, 1992, in Tokyo, Japan.

North America 
Malenko made an appearance in World Championship Wrestling (WCW) in 1992, during the Clash of the Champions XIX. He teamed with his brother to take on the team of Nikita Koloff and Ricky Steamboat in the first round of a tournament held for the NWA World Tag Team Titles. "The Malenko Brothers" came up short. Next Joe and Dean travelled to Puerto Rico to take part in the World Wrestling Council's 19th Anniversary show. They were defeated by Steve Doll and Rex King, who at the time held the WWC World Tag Team Championship.

Malenko made his first appearance in Extreme Championship Wrestling on November 18, 1994. He once again teamed up with his brother, Dean, to take on the team of Sabu and the Tazmaniac, but lost. Dean continued to work ECW, but Joe mainly worked for ECW when they toured in Florida. He worked ECW's first run of Florida shows in 1995 against Stevie Richards and Osamu Nishimura, wrestling to a draw against both. When ECW returned to Florida in May, Malenko was once again featured on the opening matches of the card. On May 5, 1995. Malenko defeated local Florida indy wrestler, and acquaintance from his father's wrestling school, Soulman Alex G. The next night in Tampa, Malenko defeated Miguel San Juan.

On the May 11, 1998 edition of WCW Monday Nitro, Joe Malenko came out and confronted Chris Jericho, who had been in a feud with Dean for weeks. However, the confrontation led to an attack by Jericho in Joe Malenko's only appearance on Nitro.

On October 25, 2010, it was announced that Malenko would be participating in All Japan Pro Wrestling's World's Strongest Tag Determination League in November and December 2010 with partner Osamu Nishimura. The duo won twice and drew once in their eight matches in the tournament, finishing eighth out of nine in the final standings.

WWE
Going by the ring name "Just Joe" in 2002. 

Affter a few backstage vignets as a non worker on several B shows. He worked atleast 2 matches,presumably try outs against his brother on both Jacked & Sunday Night Heat, with the later being considered to be an excellent match.

Retirement 
Simon retired from professional wrestling on December 7, 2010. He works as a pharmacist in Tampa, Florida.

Personal life 
Simon is Jewish.

Championships and accomplishments
All Japan Pro Wrestling
World Junior Heavyweight Championship (2 times)
Cauliflower Alley Club
Men's Wrestling Award (2023)
Pro Wrestling Illustrated
PWI ranked him #101 of the 500 best singles wrestlers in the PWI 500 in 1993
PWI ranked him #276 of the Top 500 best singles wrestlers in the PWI Years in 2003

See also
 List of Jewish professional wrestlers

References

External links 
 
 

1956 births
American male professional wrestlers
Jewish American sportspeople
Jewish professional wrestlers
Living people
People from Tampa, Florida
Professional wrestlers from Florida
Professional wrestling referees
Professional wrestling trainers
Expatriate professional wrestlers in Japan
Jesuit High School (Tampa) alumni
21st-century American Jews
World Junior Heavyweight Champions (AJPW)